Fuligny is a commune in the Aube department in north-central France.

Population

Notable people
Victor de Compiègne (1846-1877) - explorer of Gabon

See also
Communes of the Aube department

References

Communes of Aube
Aube communes articles needing translation from French Wikipedia